Keibel Gutiérrez Torna (born May 6, 1987) is a volleyball player from Cuba, who plays as a libero for the Men's National Team. He won the award for "Best Receiver" at the first 2008 Olympic Qualification Tournament in Düsseldorf, where Cuba ended up in second place and missed qualification for the 2008 Summer Olympics in Beijing, P.R. China.

Honours
 2008 Olympic Qualification Tournament — 2nd place (did not qualify)

References
 FIVB biography

External links
 profile at FIVB.org

1987 births
Living people
Cuban men's volleyball players
Place of birth missing (living people)
Volleyball players at the 2011 Pan American Games
Pan American Games silver medalists for Cuba
Pan American Games medalists in volleyball
Medalists at the 2011 Pan American Games
21st-century Cuban people